These are the Billboard magazine R&B albums that have reached number one in 1980.

Chart history

See also
1980 in music
R&B number-one hits of 1980 (USA)

1980